Jeton Neziraj is a playwright from Kosovo. He was the Artistic Director of the National Theatre of Kosovo and now he is the Director of Qendra Multimedia, a cultural production company based in Prishtina.

Background
Neziraj has written over 25 plays that have been staged and performed in Europe as well as in the USA. His plays and his writings have been translated and published in more than 15 languages, such as: German, English, French, Italian, Slovak, Macedonian, Iranian, Slovenian, Croat, Romanian, Bosnian, Spanish, Turkish, Bulgarian, Serbian, Greek etc.

As a playwright, he has worked and had his plays shown in various theatres, including La MaMa in New York, Volksbühne Berlin, Volkstheater Vienna, Piccolo Teatro di Milano, Vidy Theater in Lausanne, National Theater of Kosovo, City Garage Theater in Los Angeles, National Theater of Montenegro, Turkish National Theater, etc.

"The plays of Jeton Neziraj are raucous, irreverent and absurdist. They invoke Ibsen, Molière and Kafka...”, The Guardian wrote about his work. While the German theatre magazine Theater der Zeit and the German Radio Deutschlandfunk Kultur have described him as ‘Kafka of the Balkans’. Los Angeles Times called him “a world- class playwright who challenges our complacency at every twist and turn”.

Neziraj is the author of many articles on cultural and political issues, published in local and international magazines and journals. He is also the author of various books, including a book on the famous Kosovar actor Faruk Begolli. Neziraj is the founder and the director of Qendra Multimedia, a cultural production company based in Pristina. He was also Professor of Dramaturgy at the Faculty of Arts at the University of Pristina during the year 2007–2008. He has given speeches and has run theater workshops at several festivals, conferences and universities throughout the world.

He is member of the European Cultural Parliament and Kosovo coordinator of the EURODRAM network. He was board member of Dokufest (Prizren), and Kosovo patron for the New Plays from Europe Festival in Wiesbaden.

Awards 

 With his play Lisa is Sleeping he won the first prize at Buzuku competition for the best Albanian Play in 2006.
 He is the 2011 winner of the INPO prize for Accelerating the debate.
 His play One Flew Over the Kosovo Theater won the Special Award at the 8th edition of the JoakimInterFest (2013).
 He won the Best play award in the National Drama Festival in Ferizaj, 2016, for the play A Theater Play with Four Actors....
 In 2018, the European Union Office in Kosovo awarded him with the European of the Year award. This award is granted to individuals whose work and achievements have promoted European ideas and values.
 His play The Windmills (Die Windmühlen) was nominated for the German award Deutschen Kindertheaterpreis 2018.
 Neziraj is the winner of the EuropeCultureAward 2020

Selected staged plays

2021–2022

 A.P Department Acındırma Propaganda Birimi - Oyun Atölyesi, Istanbul, Turkey, 2022
 The Handke Project - Qendra Multimedia in association with Mittelfest & Teatro della Pergola (Italy), Theater Dortmund (Germany), National Theater Sarajevo & International Theater Festival - Scene MESS  (Bosnia and Herzegovina), 2022
 Audience by Vaclav Havel Audients - RAAAM Theatre (Estonia), 2022
 Father and Father - Integra, Prishtina, Kosovo, 2022
 The Sworn Virgin - Qendra Multimedia, Prishtina, Kosovo, 2022
 Marxists-Leninists of Switzerland - Adriana' City Theatre, Ferizaj, Kosovo, 2022
 A Play with Four Actors and Some Pigs and Some Cows and Some Horses and a Prime Minister and a Milka Cow and Some Local and International Inspectors  - Collectif7, Lyon - France (2021 - 2022)
 Balkan Bordello - La MaMa Theatre - New York, in association with Qendra Multimedia - Prishtina and Theater Atelje 212 - Belgrade
 Audience by Václav Havel (Radio play) - HRT - Hrvatski Radio, 2021
 Yue Madeleine Yue - (Το περιστατικό της Μαντλέν), Rialto Theatre - Θέατρο Ριάλτο, Limassol, Cyprus, 2021 
 Kosovo for Dummies - City Theater, Gjilan, 2021
 Peer Gynt from Kosovo - (ΠΕΕΡ ΓΚΥΝΤ ΑΠΟ ΤΟ ΚΟΣΣΟΒΟ), Theatre Skala - ΘΕΑΤΡΟ ΣΚΑΛΑ, Larnaka, Cyprus, 2021

2019–2020
 The Bridge [Most] - Bosnian National Theater in Zenica, Bosnia and Hercegovina, 2020
 AUDIENCE BY VACLAV HAVEL - Qendra Multimedia, 2020
 ΠΤΗΣΗ 1702 08 ΚΟΣΣΟΒΟ [One Flew over the Kosovo Theater] - Θέατρο Τσέπης,  Limassol, Cyprus, 2020
 The Return of Karl May - [Volksbühne Berlin, Qendra Multimedia, National Theater of Kosovo], Berlin, 2020
 Swiss Connection - Theater Winkelwiese, Zürich, 2020
 Şehir Büyüyor [Yue Madeleine Yue] - Tiyatro Tezgah, Istanbul, 2020
 a.y.l.a.n - City Theater, Gjilan, 2019
 In Five Seasons: An Enemy of the People - Qendra Multimedia, 2019
 Department of Dreams - City Garage Theatre, Los Angeles (2019)
 The Internationals - Between the Seas Festival and Theaterlab, New York (2019)
 55 Shades of Gay - La MaMa -  New York (2019)

2017–2018
 Peer Gynt from Kosovo (Kosovali Peer Gynt) - Turkish State Theater in Istanbul (2018)
 Lisa Is Sleeping Günah Çıkarma - Dina Tyiatro Turkey, 2018
 The Hypocrites or the English Patient - Qendra Multimedia, 2018
 Sworn Virgin - forever productions Zurich & Schlachthaus Theater Bern & Theater Winkelwiese Zürich & Kleintheater Luzern & Kellertheater Winterthur (2018)
 The Windmills (Mullinjët e erës) - CTC - Skopje/Shkup (2018)
 Mbreti Gjumash - City Theater - Kumanovë (2018)
 Patriotic Hypermarket - Théâtre de l’Opprimé // Théâtre national de Syldavie / Maison d’Europe et D’Orient - Paris (2017)
 55 Shades of Gay - Qendra Multimedia (2017)
 Peer Gynt from Kosovo - Qendra Multimedia (2017)
 The Windmills (Die Windmühlen) - Theater Heilbronn (2017)
 Bordel Balkan - National Theater of Kosovo (2017)

2015–2016
 Carla del Ponte Trinkt in Pristina Einen Vanilla Chai Latte  - Jochen Roller, Berlin, & FFT,  Düsseldorf & Qendra Multimedia, Prishtina (2016)
 A Play with Four Actors and Some Pigs and Some Cows and Some Horses and a Prime Minister and a Milka Cow and Some Local and International Inspectors - Qendra Multimedia, Prishtina  (2016)
 Lisa Is Sleeping (Lilza UYUYOR) - Menfi Tiyatro  - Istanbul (2016)
 Yue Madeleine Yue (Şehir Büyüyor) - Tiyatro TEMAS - Istanbul (2016)
 KOSOVO FOR DUMMIES - Schlachthaus Theater Bern, Theater Winkelwiese Zürich, Kleintheater Luzern (2015)
 The Bridge - Spinning Dot Theatre - Michigan (2015)
 War in Times of Love (La Guerre au Temps de l’Amour) - THÉÂTRE DU GRENIER - Bougival / Compagnie GRAINS DE SCÈNE (2015)
 o.rest.es in Peace - National Theater of Montenegro (2015)
 General of the Dead Army (adaptation of the Ismail Kadare's novel) - Istanbul Municipal Theater (2015)
 War in Times of Love - Qendra Multimedia (2015)

2013–2014
 In Paradise Artists Can Fly - Qendra Multimedia, Prishtina (Kosovo) & Pisa (Italy), 2014
 One Flew Over the Kosovo Theater [Geçtim Ama Tiyatrodan] - Istanbul State Theater (Istanbul) / 2014
 A P ДeПartament - Skampa Theater, Elbasan Albanaia & City Theater, Ferizaj, Kosovo & Skampa International Theater Festival / 2014
 War in Times of Love (La Guerre au Temps de l'Amour) - GARE AU THÉÂTRE & TERMOS (Paris, France) / 2014
 Peer Gynt from Kosovo - Hessisches Staatstheater Wiesbaden (Wiesbaden, Germany), Teater de Vill (Stockholm, Sweden), Qendra Multimedia (Prishtina, Kosovo) / 2014
 Yue Madeleine Yue (Büyük Şehir) - Aatiyatro & BO SAHNE (Istanbul, Turkey) / 2014
 The Demolition of the Eiffel Tower - Qendra Multimedia (Prishtina, Kosovo) / 2013
 Yue Madeleine Yue – Luzerner Theater - (Luzern- Switzerland) / 2013
 The Hustler – Qendra Multimedia (Prishtina, Kosovo) / 2013
 The Around The Globe Chain Play -  Lark Play Development Center / USA 2013 (co-written with: Dominique Morisseau (USA), Bekah Brunstetter (USA), Van Badham (Australia), Mixkaela Villalon (Philippines), Janice Poon (Hong Kong), Abdelrahem Alawji (Lebanon), John Freedman (Russia), Ulrike Syha (Germany), Enver Husicic (Netherlands), Zainabu Jallo (Nigeria), Beatriz Cabur (Spain), Sarah Grochala (UK), Sigtryggur Magnason (Iceland), Noe Morales Munoz (Mexico) and Caridad Svich (USA).

2011–2012
 One Flew Over the Kosovo Theater - 2012 - Qendra Multimedia, Pristina / National Theater of Kosovo, Pristina / National Theater of Albania, Tirana / CTC, Skopje / CZKD, Belgrade
 Yue Madeleine Yue - 2012 - Volkstheater - (Vienna- Austria), Qendra Multimedia (Prishtina, Kosovo)
The Bridge (Die Brücke) - 2012 - Hessisches Staatstheater Wiesbaden (Wiesbaden, Germany)
 The Demolition of the Eiffel Tower - 2011 - Gerald W. Lynch Theater – (New York - USA)
 The Demolition of the Eiffel Tower –2011 - SARTR Theater - Sarajevo / MESS International Theater Festival – (Sarajevo, Bosnia and Herzegovina)
 Patriotic Hypermarket (co-author) – 2011 - Bitef Theater / Kulturanova/ Qendra Multimedia  - (Belgrade and Pristina)

2009–2010 

 War in Times of Love – 2010, Yale Drama Coalition (USA)
 The Demolition of the Eiffel Tower - 2010, Fabrique Ephéméride (Paris, France)
 The Odyssey Project - 2010 - (co-author with Sebastien Joanniez (France), Sigtryggur Magnason (Iceland), Joel Horwood (England), Ozen Yula (Turkey), Nikolai Khalezin (Belarus) - The Internationalists - (New York - U.S.A)
 The General of the Dead Army - 2010 - (adaptation of the Ismail Kadare's novel) –Albanian Theatre – (Skopje, Macedonia)
 An American Tune – 2009 - (co-author) National Theatre of Macedonia (Bitola, Macedonia)

2007–2008
 Punch and Judy Murder Love – (co-author) 2008, Theatre of Prizren (Prizren)
 The Bridge – 2008, Children's Theatre Center (Skopje, Macedonia)
 The Bridge – 2007, Qendra Multimedia / CCTD (Pristina)
 Liza is Sleeping – 2007 - National Theatre of Kosovo (Pristina)
 War in Times of Love – 2008 - Nomad Theatre (UK)
 The Last Supper – 2007 - Qendra Multimedia & Markus Zohner Theatre Company, (Pristina / Lugano)
 Madeleine's war – 2007 - Oda Theatre (Pristina)

2005–2006
 Aeneas Wounded – 2006, Qendra Multimedia & 2007 Glej Theatre (Ljubljana, Slovenia)
 The Subversive Donkey – 2006, National Theatre (Gnjilane)
 Speckled Blue Eyes – 2005, Albanian Drama Theatre (Skopje, Macedonia)
 Le Roi, Le Clown, L`homme au Fouet et le Barbier – 2005, Gare au Theatre (Paris, France)
 The Longest Winter, 2005, CCTD & OMPF (Pristina)

2002–2004
 Forbidden Lesson – 2004, CCTD & Dodona Theatre (Pristina)
 Voyage to Unmikistan (co-author) 2002, L`espace d'un instant (Pristina / Paris)
 The Well – 2002, City Theater Gjilan

Existing translations of his plays

 The Handke Project - English, Serbian, Italian, German, French
 Father and Father - English
 Audience by Václav Havel - English, German, Persian, Croatian, Turkish, Estonian
 The return of Karl May - English, German, Serbian, French
 Swiss Connection - German, French, English
 a.y.l.a.n - English, German
 In Five Seasons: An Enemy of the People - English, German, Turkish, French, Serbian
 The Hypocrites or the English Patient - English, German, Turkish
 Wales Gets a King - English, Macedonian
 Sworn Virgin - German, English, Italian
 55 shades of Gay - English, German, Serbian, Hungarian, Macedonian, Slovenian. 
 Department of Dreams - English, Turkish, Dutch 
 The Internationals - English, Greek, German
 A Play with Four Actors and Some Pigs and Some Cows and Some Horses and a Prime Minister and a Milka Cow and Some Local and International Inspectors - English, German, Croatian, Italian, French, Finnish
 The Windmills - Albanian, German
 Kosovo for Dummies - German, English, Macedonian
 Bordel Balkan - Montenegrin, English, German, Slovenian, French, Italian, Macedonian
 Peer Gynt from Kosovo - German, English, Serbian, Turkish, Italian, Macedonian, French, Greek. 
 One Flew over the Kosovo theater - English, Greek, French, German, Serbian, Turkish, Italian, Slovenian, Macedonian.
 Yue Madeleine Yue- German, English, Turkish, Croatian, Greek. 
 The Demolition of the Eiffel Tower - Italian, Bosnian, English, French, German, Turkish, Macedonian, Polish, Czech
 War in Times of Love - English, German, French, Turkish, Bulgarian, Serbian, Polish, Italian and Spanish
 In Paradise Artists can Fly- English
 Aeneas Wounded - Albanian, English, Slovenian, Serbian, Romanian, Turkish
 The Hustler - English, Turkish, German
 “The Bridge” - Albanian, English, German, Bosnian, Turkish.
 Patriotic Hypermarket- Albanian, Serbian, English, French.
 “The General of the Dead Army” - Serbian, Turkish
 Speckled Blue Eyes - English, Macedonian, Spanish, Turkish
 Liza is Sleeping - English, Bulgarian, Turkish, Kurdish
 Voyage to Unmikistan - Albanian, French

References

External links
 

1977 births
Living people
Albanian dramatists and playwrights
Kosovan dramatists and playwrights